Marva is the Israel Defense Forces youth basic training program.

Marva may also refer to:

 Marva (raga) or Marwa (IAST: Mārvā), a hexatonic Indian raga
 Marva (thaat), one of the basic thaats of Hindustani music
, one of the subdivisions of Kaunas
Marva (given name)

See also

 Marwa (disambiguation)
 Marwah (disambiguation)